La Perle (en. The Pearl) (ru. «Жемчужина» or «Прелестная жемчужина»; Zhemchuzhina or Prelestnaya Zhemchuzhina) (en. Pearl or Pretty Pearl) is a ballet-divertissement in one act, with libretto and choreography by Marius Petipa and music by Riccardo Drigo.

History
La Perle was created as a pièce d'occasion for a lavish gala given at the Bolshoi Theatre of Moscow in celebration of the coronation of Emperor Nicholas II and Empress Alexandra Fydorovna. The original cast of La Perle featured the highest ranking dancers from the St. Petersburg and Moscow Imperial theatres.

While the ballet was in the early stages of production, a list of potential dancers for inclusion in the cast was created for review by a committee responsible for the coronation and its subsequent celebrations. Among those chosen for consideration in the principal roles was Nicholas II's former mistress, the ballerina Mathilde Kschessinskaya. In light of the history between Kschessinskaya and the new Emperor, his mother the Dowager Empress Marie Fyodorovna demanded that the ballerina be removed from the cast, as it would be considered scandalous for Kschessinskaya to perform in front of the Emperor's new wife, the Empress Alexandra. When Kschessinskaya learned of this, she appealed to the Emperor's uncle, the Grand Duke Vladimir Alexandrovich, whose influence reinstated the ballerina in the cast in spite of the fact that at this point the Ballet Master Petipa and the composer Drigo had completed all of the choreography and music. Petipa became extremely frustrated when he learned that he and Drigo were nonetheless required to compose a number for Kschessinskaya, which took the form of a classical pas de deux for a new character dubbed "La Perle jaune" (the Yellow Pearl) and her suitor, performed by the danseur Nikolai Legat.

Marius Petipa would revive the ballet on only one occasion for a gala performance given at Petergof in 1900. La Perle was performed often throughout the 1900s and was given its final performance in 1910.

Music
Riccardo Drigo's score featured an off-stage chorus and a large orchestra consisting of nearly 100 musicians. Contemporary critics praised the score for its rich melodic content and orchestration. Drigo would later admit in his memoirs that he found it challenging to compose the many solo variations for the ballerinas while still maintaining variety.

The Russian pedagogue Konstantin Sergeyev utilized pieces from Drigo's score for La Perle for his class concert for the Vaganova Academy titled School of Classical Dance (or From Landé to Vaganova) (ru. «Школа классического танца (От Ланде до Вагановой)»).

Synopsis 

Marius Petipa's libretto was based on the danced tableau La Pérégrina: Ballet de la Reine from Verdi's opera Don Carlos. The scene was omitted before the premiere of the opera, and would have been choreographed by Petipa's brother Lucien.

La Perle is set in a colossal subterranean grotto deep in the sea, where the White Pearl resides with her sister pearls of differing colors. The Genie of the Earth descends to the ocean floor in an attempt to abduct the White Pearl as an adornment for his crown. The King of the Corals comes the White Pearl's aid by causing a battle between the elements of the earth and of the sea. The Genie of the Earth succeeds in capturing the White Pearl, and the King of the Corals thereupon orders all of the ocean denizens to salute the Genie of the Earth side by side with the White Pearl. In an apotheosis, the Triumph of Amphitrite and Poseidon is depicted.

Original cast

Résumé of scenes and dances
Taken from the program for the coronation gala of 1896 and from Riccardo Drigo's memoirs.

Divertissement-ballet in one act
№ 01 Fanfare et introduction, Danse des perles
№ 02 Scène dansante
№ 03 Combat des coraux et métaux
№ 04 Grand pas d'ensemble
№ 05 Danse pyrrhique des armées du Roi corail, du Génie de la terre, et des perles
№ 06 Apothéose: La triomphe d'Amphitrite et de Poséidon
interpolation: "La Perle jaune" pas de deux for Mathilde Kschessinskaya

Gallery

Footnotes 

Ballets by Marius Petipa
Ballets by Riccardo Drigo
1896 ballet premieres
Ballets premiered at the Bolshoi Theatre